The 2014–15 United Counties League season (known as the 2014–15 ChromaSport & Trophies United Counties League for sponsorship reasons) was the 108th in the history of the United Counties League, a football competition in England.

Premier Division

The Premier Division featured 17 clubs which competed in the division last season, along with four new clubs:
Eynesbury Rovers, promoted from Division One
Harrowby United, promoted from Division One
Oadby Town, promoted from Division One
Thurnby Nirvana, promoted from the East Midlands Counties League

League table

Results

Division One

Division One featured 19 clubs which competed in the division last season, along with one new club:
Stewarts & Lloyds Corby, relegated from the Premier Division

League table

Results

References

External links
 United Counties League

9
United Counties League seasons